Dafydd Baentiwr was a 16th-century Welsh poet. A bardic controversy (ymryson) contains his only known surviving works (a poem written by Dafydd to Gruffydd, a poem written by Gruffydd in reply, and another poem written by Dafydd).

References 

16th-century Welsh poets
Welsh male poets
Date of birth unknown
Date of death unknown